Abraximorpha is a small South Asian genus of skippers in the family Hesperiidae.

Species 
The following species are recognised in the genus Abraximorpha:
 Abraximorpha davidii (Mabille, 1876) 
A. d. davidii - China (Sichuan, Shaanxi, Hubei, Zhejiang, Jiangxi, Anhui)
A. d. ermasis (Fruhstorfer, 1914) - Taiwan
A. d. elfina Evans, 1949 - Vietnam
 Abraximorpha esta Evans, 1949 - Yunnan, Burma, Vietnam, Laos

Former species 
 Abraximorpha heringi Liu & Gu, 1994 - transferred to Albiphasma heringi (Liu & Gu, 1994)
 Abraximorpha pieridoides Mell, 1922 - transferred to Albiphasma pieridoides (Mell, 1922)

References
Natural History Museum Lepidoptera genus database

Tagiadini
Hesperiidae genera